William Jermyn Conlin (July 26, 1831 – November 19, 1891), better known by his stage name William J. Florence, was a US actor, songwriter, and playwright. Florence awarded the ribbon of the French Societe Histoire Dramatique.  He was also co-founder with Walter M. Fleming of the Shriners, a Masonic Order.

Biography
Born of Irish parents and raised in New York City, Florence worked at various jobs before becoming a call boy at the Old Bowery Theater.  While working to support his widowed mother and her seven younger children, he rehearsed plays at night, and in 1850 he began to do dialect impersonations.  In 1853 he married Malvina Pray, and thereafter the two generally appeared together on the stage; he usually as an Irishman and she as a Yankee. Florence gained national prominence with a forty-year career in which he excelled at playing the humorous and poetic Irish character. Ticket-of-Leave Man was presented by him more than one thousand times on national tours. In his later years he partnered with actor Joseph Jefferson as half of a comedy duo.

From Malvina's observation of wealthy American on vacation abroad, Florence asked Benjamin Edward Woolf to write The Mighty Dollar, that the couple would perform in over 2,500 times during the mid-1870s and well into the 1880s.

Conlin was fond of Florence, Italy, where he had an apartment, and adopted the city for his stage name. At some point after he became famous under this name, he secured the legal right to it.

Florence's first success was in A Row at the Lyceum (1851); following this, he established his reputation as Captain Cuttle in Dombey and Son, Bob Brierly in The Ticket-of-Leave Man, and Sir Lucius O’Trigger in The Rivals.  His last appearance was as Zekiel Homespun in a production of Heir-at-Law. 

Florence died in Philadelphia on November 19, 1891. He is interred at Green-Wood Cemetery in Brooklyn.

Literature
 McKay and Wingate, Famous American Actors of To-Day (New York, 1896)
 Matthews and Hutton, Actors and Actresses of Great Britain and the United States (New York, 1886)
 Winter, The Wallet of Time (New York, 1913)

Notes

References

External links

 
 

American male stage actors
Songwriters from New York (state)
1831 births
1891 deaths
Shriners
Writers from Albany, New York
Male actors from New York (state)
Actors from Albany, New York
19th-century American dramatists and playwrights
The Lambs presidents
19th-century American musicians
19th-century American male actors